Team Scott–Marcondes Cesar–São José dos Campos was a Brazilian UCI Continental road bicycle racing team, based on São José dos Campos. The team was created in 1993 by José Carlos Monteiro, who is the general team manager since its foundation. After a financial struggle in the first half of 2009 which included not paying up to 6 months of some rides salaries, the team secured a Professional Continental licence for 2010. However, further financial difficulties, including lack of payment to its rides, resulted in the teams suspension by the UCI from August 2010 and onwards. In November 2010 it was revealed that the teams bank guarantee, which is required by all Pro Continental teams, was a counterfeit and no money had been deposited.

Major wins

2007
Copa América de Ciclismo, Nilceu Santos
 National Road Championship, Nilceu Santos
 National Individual Time-Trial Championship, Pedro Nicacio
Overall and U23 Tour de Santa Catarina, Alex Diniz

2008
Copa América de Ciclismo, Nilceu Santos
U23 Tour de San Luis, Magno Nazaret
Overall Torneio de Verão, Daniel Rogelim

2009
Copa América de Ciclismo, Francisco Chamorro
Team Time Trial Prologue Volta de Ciclismo Internacional do Estado de São Paulo

Notable team members

References

External links

Cycling teams based in Brazil
Organisations based in São José dos Campos
Cycling teams established in 1993
Sports teams in São Paulo (state)
1993 establishments in Brazil